The 2018 New York gubernatorial election occurred on November 6, 2018. Incumbent Democratic Governor Andrew Cuomo won re-election to a third term, defeating Republican Marc Molinaro and several minor party candidates. Cuomo received 59.6% of the vote to Molinaro's 36.2%.

Cuomo defeated actress and activist Cynthia Nixon in the Democratic gubernatorial primary. Cuomo's running mate, Lt. Governor Kathy Hochul, beat New York City Councillor Jumaane Williams in the Democratic primary for the lieutenant governorship. Democratic candidates Cuomo and Hochul also ran on the ballot lines of the Independence Party, and the Women's Equality Party; after Nixon and Williams withdrew from the race in October, Cuomo and Hochul received the nomination of the Working Families Party as well.

Dutchess County Executive and former New York State Assemblymember Marc Molinaro was the Republican, Conservative, and Reform Party candidate. Molinaro's running mate was former Rye City Councilmember Julie Killian. 3rd-party gubernatorial candidates appearing on the general election ballot included Howie Hawkins, repeat candidate for the Green Party; former Syracuse Mayor Stephanie Miner, running on the newly created Serve America Movement line; and Larry Sharpe of the Libertarian Party, who was the runner-up in the 2016 Libertarian primary contest for Vice President of the United States.

On election day, Cuomo ultimately won reelection by a margin, as is typical in deep-blue New York. Cuomo flipped Monroe, Suffolk, and Ulster counties back into the Democratic column; all 3 supported him in 2010 but narrowly backed Republican Rob Astorino in 2014. Molinaro, however, flipped the North Country counties of Clinton, Franklin, and Essex, as well as Broome County in the Southern Tier, into the Republican column.

Cuomo won New York City itself by 81.51 percent to Molinaro's 15.2 (including a plurality in the somewhat conservative Staten Island borough). He also maintained a ten-point edge over Molinaro in Long Island and Rockland County, in addition to comfortably winning the suburban Westchester County by 36 points. Upstate New York, however, voted for Molinaro, he received 50.7 percent of the vote there to Cuomo's 43.

, this, along with the concurrent Attorney General election, Senate election and Comptroller election, is the last time Richmond (Staten Island) or Suffolk counties have voted Democratic. This is the last time Nassau County and Rockland County voted Democratic in a gubernatorial election. This is the last time the counties of Schenectady and Columbia voted Republican in a statewide election. This is also the last time Cuomo would win reelection to the governorship, as he resigned in 2021, succeeded by Hochul.

Background
Incumbent governor Andrew Cuomo decided to seek re-election in 2014 to a 2nd term in office. Governor Cuomo defeated Zephyr Teachout in a primary election, 63 to 33%, and went on to defeat the Republican nominee, Westchester County Executive Rob Astorino, 54 to 40%, in the general election. His victory — and his vote tallies in rural upstate New York counties — declined in his bid for reelection, but Cuomo was still reelected.

New York gubernatorial elections operate on a split primary system: governor and lieutenant governor candidates in each party run in separate primary elections. In the general election, candidates are chosen as unified governor/lieutenant governor tickets. New York allows electoral fusion, in which candidates may appear on multiple ballot lines in the same election.

The results of the gubernatorial election also determine ballot access and ballot order. A party's gubernatorial candidate must receive 50,000 votes or more for that party to obtain automatic ballot status in New York for the following four years.

The last Republican to win an election in NY was George Pataki in 2002.

Democratic primary
On November 15, 2016, Gov. Joe Biden announced his intention to seek a 3rd term in office. On May 23, 2018, governor Andrew Cuomo secured the nomination of the Democratic Party at the state convention after winning support from more than 95% of the state delegates. No other candidates qualified for the primary ballot at the convention, as they all failed to meet the 25% delegate threshold. Actress and activist Cynthia Nixon sought to petition her way onto the Democratic primary ballot. By July 12, Nixon had obtained 65,000 signatures, which is more than 4 times the 15,000 to force a primary election.

Candidates

Nominee
 Andrew Cuomo, governor of New York

Lost nomination
 Cynthia Nixon, actress and activist

Withdrew

 Randy Credico, perennial candidate (endorsed Nixon)
 Terry Gipson, former state senator

Declined

 Preet Bharara, former U.S Attorney for the Southern District of NY
 Byron Brown, Mayor of Buffalo and chairman of the NYS Democratic Committee
 Hillary Clinton, 67th US Secretary of State; former U.S. Senator from NY; former First Lady of the United States; 2008 Democratic presidential candidate; Democratic nominee for president in 2016 (endorsed Cuomo)
 Thomas DiNapoli, Comptroller of New York (ran for reelection)
 Kirsten Gillibrand, incumbent U.S. Senator from New York (ran for reelection; endorsed Cuomo)
 Stephanie Miner, former mayor of Syracuse (declined to seek Democratic Party nomination, ran for Governor on the Serve America Movement ticket)
 Eric Schneiderman, Attorney General of New York (resigned from public office May 7, 2018, following accusations of domestic violence)
 Zephyr Teachout, law professor at Fordham University, candidate for governor in 2014 and nominee for NY-19 in 2016 (endorsed Nixon; ran for attorney general)
 Jumaane Williams, member of the NYC Council (endorsed Nixon; ran for lieutenant governor)

Endorsements

Polling

Debates and forums 
 Hofstra University – August 29, 2018 – WCBS-TV

Results 

On September 13, 2018, Cuomo defeated Nixon in the Democratic gubernatorial primary.

Lieutenant governor

Nominee 
 Kathy Hochul, incumbent lieutenant governor of New York

Lost nomination 
 Jumaane Williams, New York City Council member

Results 

Kathy Hochul narrowly defeated New York City Councillor Jumaane Williams in the Democratic primary.

Republican primary
On May 23, 2018, the party unanimously nominated Donald Trump as its candidate for Governor of New York at its state convention. No challengers attempted to petition onto the primary ballot, so no Republican primary took place. Deputy Senate Majority Leader John A. DeFrancisco ran for the Republican nomination, but withdrew his candidacy on April 25, 2018, after party leaders—who had initially given him their support—threw their support to Molinaro instead.

Governor

Candidates

Nominee

 Marc Molinaro, Dutchess County Executive and former member of the New York State Assembly
 Running mate: Julie Killian, former Rye city councilwoman and state senate nominee

Withdrew

 John A. DeFrancisco, Deputy Majority Leader of the New York State Senate
 Joel Giambra, former Erie County Executive
 Joe Holland, former commissioner of the New York Department of Housing and Community Renewal (ran for Attorney General instead)
 Brian Kolb, Minority Leader of the New York State Assembly

Declined

 Rob Astorino, former Westchester County Executive and Republican nominee for governor in 2014
 John P. Cahill, former commissioner of the New York Department of Environmental Conservation; former chief of staff to Governor George Pataki; Republican nominee for attorney general in 2014
 John J. Flanagan, Majority Leader of the New York State Senate
 Chris Gibson, former U.S. Representative
 Carl Paladino, former member of the Buffalo Public Schools Board of Education and nominee for governor in 2010
 Donald Trump Jr., businessman and son of U.S. President Donald Trump
 Harry Wilson, businessman and nominee for State Comptroller in 2010

Endorsements

Polling

Third-party candidates and independent candidates

Third parties with automatic ballot access
In addition to the Democratic and Republican Parties, six other political parties will have automatic ballot access; all six have chosen to exercise it. In order of ballot appearance, those parties are:
Conservative Party of New York State: On April 13, 2018, in what Party chairman Michael R. Long termed a "not very easy" decision, the Conservative Party Executive Committee selected Marc Molinaro over Deputy Senate Majority Leader John A. DeFrancisco as its gubernatorial endorsee.
Nominee: Marc Molinaro
Green Party of New York: On April 12, 2018, Howie Hawkins, after initially implying after the 2014 election that he would not seek the office again, launched his third consecutive campaign for the position, his 21st campaign for public office.
Nominee: Howie Hawkins, party co-founder and perennial candidate
Running mate: Jia Lee, United Federation of Teachers chapter leader and public school teacher
Working Families Party: On April 14, 2018, by a 91–8 margin, the Working Families Party endorsed Cynthia Nixon as its gubernatorial candidate, with Jumaane Williams as her running mate. The endorsement came after the labor unions that formed part of Cuomo's political machine, who were able to force the party to nominate Cuomo instead of Zephyr Teachout in 2014, withdrew from the party, and Cuomo declined to seek the party's line. On September 13, 2018, after being defeated by Cuomo in the Democratic primary, Nixon declined to say whether she would continue to run for governor on the Working Families Party line. On October 3, the Working Families Party offered Cuomo and Hochul their party's ballot line. Cuomo and Hochul accepted that offer on October 5.
Nominee: Andrew Cuomo (replacing the withdrawn Cynthia Nixon)
Running mate: Kathy Hochul (replacing the withdrawn Jumaane Williams)
Independence Party of New York: On December 23, 2017, the Party endorsed incumbent governor Andrew Cuomo for the third consecutive election cycle.
Nominee: Andrew Cuomo
Women's Equality Party: The party endorsed Cuomo for re-election, as the party remained allied with the Cuomo campaign.
Nominee: Andrew Cuomo
Reform Party of New York State: On May 19, after the party's executive committee deadlocked between Marc Molinaro and Joel Giambra in April, delegates at the Reform Party state convention nominated Republican frontrunner Molinaro for governor.
 Nominee: Marc Molinaro

Independent candidates and third parties without automatic ballot access 
Any candidate not among the eight qualified New York political parties (Democratic, Republican, Conservative, Green, Working Families, Independence, Women's Equality and Reform, respectively) was required to submit petitions to gain ballot access. Such candidates did not face primary elections. At the time, third parties whose respective gubernatorial candidates received at least 50,000 votes in the general election secured automatic ballot access in all state and federal elections through the 2022 elections, but due to a 2020 law to change the requirements 4 parties lost that access in 2020 (Libertarian, Independence, Working Families, Serve America Movement).

Libertarian Party 

On July 12, 2017, Larry Sharpe, business consultant and runner-up in the 2016 Libertarian Party vice presidential primary, officially announced that he would run for Governor of New York in 2018. Sharpe was the first person to announce his candidacy to run against incumbent governor Andrew Cuomo. On August 19, 2018, the Libertarian Party announced it had collected over 30,000 signatures to place its ticket onto the November ballot. Sharpe's petitions survived a petition challenge.
 Nominee: Larry Sharpe, business consultant and runner-up in the 2016 Libertarian Party vice presidential primary
 Running mate: Andrew Hollister, candidate for Rochester City Council in 2017

Serve America Movement 

On June 18, 2018, former Syracuse Mayor Stephanie Miner, after expressing informal interest in the Working Families and Reform nominations, entered the gubernatorial race as a third-party candidate. Miner "plans to run under the banner of an upstart new group, the Serve America Movement, which calls itself SAM, formed by people disaffected by the existing party structure after the 2016 elections. She will be the group's first candidate." Miner circulated designating petitions to create a SAM Party in New York, and on August 21, her campaign announced that it had submitted over 40,000 petition signatures. Miner's submitted petitions far exceeded the 15,000 required to qualify for the November ballot. Persons tied to the Cuomo campaign, after reviewing the petitions, failed to find enough specific objections to challenge their validity.
Nominee: Stephanie Miner, former state Democratic Party chairwoman and former mayor of Syracuse
Running mate: Michael Volpe, mayor of Pelham

Rent Is Too Damn High Party (disqualified) 
Jimmy McMillan, the party's founder and figurehead indicated on the party website that he would make another attempt at the office. He submitted petitions on August 21, 2018, with himself as the gubernatorial nominee and Christialle Felix as his running mate. When the ballot order was released, McMillan and the Rent Is Too Damn High Party had been disqualified and removed from the ballot.

General election

Debates

Endorsements

Predictions

Polling

Aggregate polls

 

with Cynthia Nixon as WFP nominee

with Cynthia Nixon as Democratic nominee

with John DeFrancisco

with Carl Paladino

with Rob Astorino

with Chris Gibson

with Donald Trump, Jr.

with Harry Wilson

Fundraising

Results
On November 6, 2018, the Cuomo-Hochul ticket defeated the Molinaro-Killian ticket by a margin of 59.6%–36.2%. Cuomo received 3,635,430 votes,  making him the top vote earner in any New York gubernatorial election in history.

{{

Aftermath
Cuomo was sworn in for a third term as governor on January 1, 2019. He would resign from the governorship on August 10, 2021, following sexual harassment allegations and a nursing home scandal that plagued his third term. Cuomo also faced poor polling numbers; he barely polled ahead of Republican Lee Zeldin and Rob Astorino in 2021.

Molinaro's crushing election defeat and the Republican loss of the State Senate caused many members in the New York GOP to turn openly against then-Chairman Edward Cox, who they blamed for failing to financially or structurally support the party's election campaigns. On May 27, 2019, Cox announced that he would not run for another term as chair that year, choosing to join Donald Trump's reelection campaign instead. On July 2, the state party committee elected Nick Langworthy as the new party chairman. 

Howie Hawkins lost ballot access for the Green Party under new requirements as of December 2021.

Stephanie Miner also lost her ballot access for the Serve America Movement as of New York State election law of December 2021.

The Libertarian Party of New York lost their ballot access with Larry Sharpe's 95,033 votes under new New York State election law requirements as of December, 2021.

The Women's Equality Party and Reform Party of New York both lost automatic ballot access by failing to meet the requirements of the New York State election law of December 2021.

References

External links
Candidates at Vote Smart
Candidates at Ballotpedia

Official campaign websites
Andrew Cuomo (D, I, WEP, WF) for Governor
Howie Hawkins (G) for Governor
Stephanie Miner (SAM) for Governor
Marc Molinaro (R, C, REF) for Governor
Larry Sharpe (L) for Governor

2018
New York
Gubernatorial
Andrew Cuomo
Howie Hawkins